Robert Rolle (c. 1677 – 18 November 1710) of Stevenstone, in Devon, was an English landowner and Tory politician who sat in the English and British House of Commons between 1701 and 1710.

Early life 
Rolle was the eldest son of John Rolle, son and heir apparent of Sir John Rolle  of Stevenstone, and his  wife Lady Christiana Bruce, daughter of  Robert Bruce, 1st Earl of Ailesbury and 2nd Earl of Elgin. Rolle's father died on  22 April 1689 during the lifetime of his father, and his mother married secondly Sir Robert Gayer, KB, of Buckinghamshire.  Thus he was heir to his grandfather Sir John Rolle on his death in 1706. The Rolle family was one of the richest and most powerful in Devon and owned several dozen manors, their most ancient holding being Stevenstone near Great Torrington in the north of the county, whilst Bicton in the east was the centre of another large block of territory.

Career
Rolle was returned as Member of Parliament for Callington, a pocket borough of the Rolle family, at the  two general elections of 1701. At the 1702 English general election he was returned as Tory MP for Devon. He was returned at the 1705 English general election and voted against the Court candidate as Speaker on 25 October 1705. 
 

Rolle married on 19 March 1705   Elizabeth Duke (died 1716), daughter of Richard Duke (1652–1733), MP, of Otterton, Devon, which manor adjoined the Rolle seat of Bicton. On his marriage Robert received an annual settlement of £1,500 from his grandfather Sir John Rolle.

On his grandfather's death in 1706 Rolle inherited the Rolle estates, including the two principal seats of Stevenstone and Bicton. It was soon discovered that the estate was encumbered by liabilities of about £15,000, comprising debts, legacies and portions. It thus became essential to realise some of the assets, which were however tied-up in trusts and entails. With his two brothers, he petitioned parliament on 11 February 1708 to obtain a private Act of Parliament enabling them to break the trusts in order to make these sales.  

At the 1708 British general election Rolle was returned again as MP for Devon. After the "Rolle's Estate Bill"   was passed in 1710, Rolle was enabled to sell some out-lying parts of the estate and re-invest any surplus proceeds in purchases by the same trust in lands situated more conveniently.  As a Tory, he  voted against the impeachment of Henry Sacheverell in 1710.

Death and legacy
Rolle died on 18 August 1710 after having become ill at the Exeter Assizes allegedly from a "surfeit of drinking" and died "of convulsion fits". He was buried at Bicton and his heir was his younger brother John Rolle (1679–1730), MP. His nephew Dennis Rolle (died 1797) of Stevenstone, later purchased in 1786 the manors of Otterton and East Budleigh from the heirs of the last male of the Duke family.

Monument in Barnstaple

In 1708 Robert Rolle donated to the Corporation of Barnstaple, Devon, a large stone statue of Queen Anne, the victorious monarch of the recent Battle of Blenheim in 1704, which was placed atop the newly constructed Mercantile Exchange, which thenceforth bore the name Queen Anne's Walk. Underneath the statue, possibly intended to be free-standing and not on top of this building, is its original base, now seated somewhat incongruously above the Royal Arms. On the base is an escutcheon showing a cartouche with the arms of Rolle, now much worn, above which is the Rolle crest: A cubit arm erect vested or charged with a fess indented cotised azure in the hand a roll of parchment. On either side of the Rolle arms is a seated naked, disheveled and shackled French prisoner of war, behind whom is a centrally placed antique trophy of arms consisting of captured French weapons (two canon, muskets, a club, a halberd and a helmet etc.) and two lowered French standards on either side. The imagery is reminiscent of the sculptures of two French captives atop the central pediment of Blenheim Palace, built for the Duke of Marlborough, the victorious English commander at that battle. The original source for both is imagery from the classical world, as visible for example on Roman coins. On each side of the base of the statue of Queen Anne is an escutcheon showing the arms of Rolle impaling Duke, the arms of his wife. Immediately below the feet of the Queen is a tablet on which is inscribed the following Latin text: "Anna, Intemeratae fidei testimonium Roberti Rolle de Stephenstone in agro Devoniensi Armigeri MDCCVIII" ("Anne, a   testament of the undefiled faith of Robert Rolle, Esquire, of Stevenstone in the land of Devonshire, 1708"). The gift of this statue appears to have prompted the Corporation to build the mercantile exchange, financed by a dozen or so of the leading merchants whose arms are sculpted within the frieze, on the quay now known as Queen Anne's Walk, on top of which sits the statue. The inscription was transcribed by the Devon topographer Rev. John Swete in his "Journals".

References

Sources
Vivian, Lt.Col. J.L., The Visitations of the County of Devon, Exeter, 1895, pp. 652–656, Rolle of Stevenstone

Members of the Parliament of Great Britain for Devon
Robert
Members of the Parliament of England for Callington
Members of the Parliament of England (pre-1707) for Devon
1670s births
1710 deaths
Year of birth uncertain